Ronna is a feminine given name. People with that name include:
 Ronna Brott, Master with the Ontario Superior Court
 Ronna Burger (born 1947), American philosopher
 Ronna C. Johnson, American professor of English
 Ronna McDaniel (born 1973), American political operative
 Ronna Reeves (born 1968), American country music singer
 Ronna Romney (born 1943), American Republican politician and radio talk show host

Fictional people
 Ronna Beckman, a character in The West Wing

See also 
 ronna-, a metric prefix denoting a factor of 1027
 Ronna and Beverly, characters created and embodied by actor/comedians Jessica Chaffin and Jamie Denbo
 Ronna-Rae Leonard (active from 2017), Canadian politician
 Ranna (disambiguation)
 HMT Rohna
 Roma (disambiguation)
 Rona (disambiguation)